is a Japanese footballer currently playing as a defender for Tampines Rovers.

Career

Albriex Niigata (S)
Shuya Yamashita moved to Albriex Niigata (S) on 17 January 2021。。

Tampines Rovers
After a year in Singapore, he moved on to join Tampines Rovers on 4 January 2022 。

He extends his contract for another season at the end of 2022.

Career statistics

Club
.

Notes

References

1999 births
Living people
Sportspeople from Ishikawa Prefecture
Association football people from Ishikawa Prefecture
Tokoha University alumni
Japanese footballers
Japanese expatriate footballers
Association football defenders
Albirex Niigata Singapore FC players
Tampines Rovers FC players
Japanese expatriate sportspeople in Singapore
Expatriate footballers in Singapore